Bert Day (13 March 1900 – 25 August 1964) was an Australian rules footballer who played for the St Kilda Football Club in the Victorian Football League (VFL).

Notes

External links 

1900 births
1964 deaths
Australian rules footballers from South Australia
St Kilda Football Club players
North Adelaide Football Club players